Liutan Station, is a metro station of Line 1 and Line 4 of Wuxi Metro. It started operations on 1 July 2014.

Station Layout

Exits
There are 2 exits for this station.

References

Railway stations in Jiangsu
Wuxi Metro stations
Railway stations in China opened in 2014